Ethalia minolina is a species of sea snail, a marine gastropod mollusk in the family Trochidae, the top snails.

The epithet minolina was given because of the resemblance with the genus Minolia.

M.M. Scheprman has described a variety Ethalia minolia var. infralaevior from Indonesian waters.

Description
The height of the shell attains 6 mm, its diameter 10 mm. The pretty bright shell has a depressedly conical shape. It contains six whorls of rufous-flesh colour. They are uniformly very closely striate with threads with a pattern of banded filleting  of white and fawn colour. The deep umbilicus is partly covered by the tongue-shaped callus extending from the columellar margin. The body whorl is at its periphery round-angulate. The operculum is corneous.

References

External links
 To World Register of Marine Species

minolina
Gastropods described in 1897